Perspectivism (also called perspectivalism) is the epistemological principle that perception of and knowledge of something are always bound to the interpretive perspectives of those observing it. While perspectivism  regard all perspectives and interpretations as being of equal truth or value, it holds that no one has access to an absolute view of the world cut off from perspective. Instead, all such  occurs from some point of view which in turn affects how things are perceived. Rather than attempt to determine truth by correspondence to things outside any perspective, perspectivism thus generally seeks to determine truth by comparing and evaluating perspectives among themselves. Perspectivism may be regarded as an early form of epistemological pluralism, though in some accounts includes treatment of value theory, moral psychology, and realist metaphysics.

Early forms of perspectivism have been identified in the philosophies of Protagoras, Michel de Montaigne, and Gottfried Leibniz. However, its first major statement is considered to be Friedrich Nietzsche's development of the concept in the 19th century, having built off Gustav Teichmüller's use of the term some years prior. For Nietzsche, perspectivism takes the form of a realist antimetaphysics while rejecting both the correspondence theory of truth and the notion that the truth-value of a belief always constitutes its ultimate worth-value. The perspectival conception of objectivity used by Nietzsche sees the deficiencies of each perspective as remediable by an asymptotic study of the differences between them. This stands in contrast to Platonic notions in which objective truth is seen to reside in a wholly non-perspectival domain. Despite this, perspectivism is often misinterpreted as a form of relativism or as a rejection of objectivity entirely. Though it is often mistaken to imply that no way of seeing the world can be taken as definitively true, perspectivism can instead be interpreted as holding certain interpretations (such as that of perspectivism itself) to be definitively true.

During the 21st century, perspectivism has led a number of developments within analytic philosophy and philosophy of science, particularly under the early influence of Ronald Giere, Jay Rosenberg, Ernest Sosa, and others. This contemporary form of perspectivism, also known as scientific perspectivism, is more narrowly focused than prior forms—centering on the perspectival limitations of scientific models, theories, observations, and focused interest, while remaining more compatible for example with Kantian philosophy and correspondence theories of truth. Furthermore, scientific perspecitivism has come to address a number of scientific fields such as physics, biology, cognitive neuroscience, and medicine, as well as interdisciplinarity and philosophy of time. Studies of perspectivism have also been introduced into contemporary anthropology, initially through the influence of Eduardo Viveiros de Castro and his research into indigenous cultures of South America.

The basic principle that things are perceived differently from different perspectives (or that perspective determines one's limited and unprivileged access to knowledge) has sometimes been accounted as a rudimentary, uncontentious form of perspectivism. The basic practice of comparing contradictory perspectives to one another may also be considered one such form of perspectivism , as may the entire philosophical problem of how true knowledge is to penetrate one's perspectival limitations.

Precursors and early developments 

In Western languages, scholars have found perspectivism in the philosophies of Heraclitus ( – ), Protagoras ( – ), Michel de Montaigne (1533 – 1592 CE), and Gottfried Leibniz (1646 – 1716 CE). The origins of perspectivism have also been found to lie also within Renaissance developments in philosophy of art and its artistic notion of perspective. In Asian languages, scholars have found perspectivism in Buddhist, Jain, and Daoist texts. Anthropologists have found a kind of perspectivism in the thinking of some indigenous peoples.

Ancient Greek philosophy 

The Western origins of perspectivism can be found in the pre-Socratic philosophies of Heraclitus and Protagoras. In fact, a major cornerstone of Plato's philosophy is his rejection and opposition to perspectivism—this forming a principal element of his aesthetics, ethics, epistemology, and theology. The antiperspectivism of Plato made him a central target of critique for later perspectival philosophers such as Nietzsche.

Montaigne 

Montaigne's philosophy presents in itself a  less as a doctrinaire position than as a core philosophical approach put into practice. Inasmuch as no one can occupy a God's-eye view, Montaigne holds that no one has access to a view which is totally unbiased, which does not  according to its own perspective. It is instead only the underlying psychological biases which view one's own perspective as unbiased. In a passage from his "Of Cannibals", he writes:

Nietzsche 

In his works, Nietzsche makes a number of statements on perspective which at times contrast each other throughout the development of his philosophy. Nietzsche's  begins by challenging the underlying notions of 'viewing from nowhere', 'viewing from everywhere', and 'viewing without interpreting' as being absurdities. Instead, all  is attached to some perspective, and all viewers are limited in some sense to the perspectives at their command. In The Genealogy of Morals he writes: 

In this, Nietzsche takes a contextualist approach which rejects any God's-eye view of the world. This has been further linked to his notion of the death of God and the dangers of a resulting relativism. However, Nietzsche's perspectivism itself stands in sharp contrast to any such relativism. In outlining his perspectivism, Nietzsche rejects those who claim everything to be subjective, by disassembling the notion of the subject as itself a mere invention and interpretation. He further states that, since the two are mutually dependent on each other, the collapse of the God's-eye view causes also the notion of the thing-in-itself to fall apart with it. Nietzsche views this collapse to reveal, through his genealogical project, that all that has been considered non-perspectival knowledge, the entire tradition of Western metaphysics, has itself been only a perspective. His perspectivism and genealogical project are further integrated into each other in addressing the psychological drives that underlie various philosophical programs and perspectives, as a form of critique. Here, contemporary scholar Ken Gemes views Nietzsche's perspectivism to above all be a principle of moral psychology, rejecting interpretations of it as an epistemological thesis outrightly. It is through this method of critique that the deficiencies of various perspectives can be alleviated—through a critical mediation of the differences between them rather than any appeals to the non-perspectival. In a posthumously published aphorism from The Will to Power, Nietzsche writes: 

While Nietzsche does not plainly reject truth and objectivity, he does reject the notions of  truth,  facts, and  objectivity.

Truth theory and the value of truth 

Despite receiving much attention within contemporary philosophy, there is no academic consensus on Nietzsche's conception of truth. Contemporary scholars Steven D. Hales and Robert C. Welshon write that:

Later developments 

In the 20th century, perspectivism was discussed separately by José Ortega y Gasset and Karl Jaspers.

Ortega 
Ortega's perspectivism, replaced his previous position that "man is completely social". His reversal is prominent in his work Verdad y perspectiva ("Truth and perspective"), where he explained that "each man has a mission of truth" and that what he sees of reality no other eye sees. He explained:From different positions two people see the same surroundings. However, they do not see the same thing. Their different positions mean that the surroundings are organized in a different way: what is in the foreground for one may be in the background for another. Furthermore, as things are hidden one behind another, each person will see something that the other may not.Ortega also maintained that perspective is perfected by the multiplication of its viewpoints. He noted that war transpires due to the lack of perspective and failure to see the larger contexts of the actions among nations. Ortega also cited the importance of phenomenology in perspectivism as he argued against speculation and the importance of concrete evidence in understanding truth and reality. In this discourse, he highlighted the role of "circumstance" in finding out the truth since it allows us to understand realities beyond ourselves.

Philosophy of science

Varieties 
Contemporary varieties of perspectivism include:
 Individualist perspectivism
 Collectivist perspectivism
 Transcendental perspectivism
 Theological perspectivism

See also 

 Anekantavada, a fundamental doctrine of Jainism setting forth a pluralistic metaphysics, traceable to Mahavira (599–527 BCE)
 Blind men and an elephant
 Conceptual framework
 Consilience, the unity of knowledge
 Constructivist epistemology
 Eclecticism
 Fallibilism
 Fusion of horizons
 Integral theory (disambiguation)
 Intersubjectivity
 Metaphilosophy
 Model-dependent realism
 Moral nihilism
 Moral skepticism
 Multiperspectivalism, a current in Calvinist epistemology
 Philosophy of Friedrich Nietzsche
 
 Point of view (philosophy)
 Rhizome (philosophy)
 Standpoint theory
 Value pluralism

References

Consensus reality
Epistemological theories
Philosophy of Friedrich Nietzsche
Hermeneutics
Philosophical analogies
Philosophical theories
Criticism of rationalism